Slovakia–Ukraine relations are foreign relations between Slovakia and Ukraine.
Both countries established diplomatic relations on January 1, 1993. Slovakia has an embassy in Kyiv, a general consulate in Uzhhorod, and 2 honorary consulates (in Donetsk and Uzhhorod). Ukraine has an embassy in Bratislava and a general consulate in Prešov.

The countries share 97 km of common border. There are between 40,000 and 100,000 people of Ukrainian descent living in Slovakia. 

During the Interwar era the Ukrainian Oblast Zakarpattia was part of Czechoslovakia, before being ceded to Hungary.

See also 
 Foreign relations of Slovakia
 Foreign relations of Ukraine
 Slovakia–Ukraine border

References

External links
  Slovak embassy in Kyiv
  Ukrainian embassy in Bratislava

 
Ukraine
Bilateral relations of Ukraine